Torreperogil is a Spanish geographical indication for Vino de la Tierra wines located in the autonomous region of Andalusia. Vino de la Tierra is one step below the mainstream Denominación de Origen indication on the Spanish wine quality ladder.

The area covered by this geographical indication comprises the municipalities of Úbeda, Sabiote, Rus, Cabra del Santo Cristo, Canena and Torreperogil, in the province of Jaén, (Andalusia, Spain). 

It acquired its Vino de la Tierra status in 2006.

Grape varieties
 Red: Garnacha tinta, Syrah, Cabernet Sauvignon and Tempranillo
 White: Jaén blanco and Pedro Ximénez

References

Spanish wine
Wine regions of Spain
Wine-related lists
Appellations